Leonard Yeo (by 1512 – 30 May 1586), of London and Totnes, Devon, was an English politician.

He was a Member (MP) of the Parliament of England for Totnes in 1555, 1558 and 1559.

References

1586 deaths
Members of the Parliament of England (pre-1707) for Totnes
1512 births
English MPs 1555
English MPs 1558
English MPs 1559